The Santa Ana River Trail is a multi-use trail complex that runs alongside the Santa Ana River in southern California. The trail stretches  from the Pacific Ocean at Huntington Beach along the Santa Ana River to the Orange–Riverside county line. Planned extensions of the trail reach to Big Bear Lake in San Bernardino County. In 1989, the Los Angeles Times described the path as "a veritable freeway for bicycles".

Description
Many intersections with local streets are grade separated with bridges or underpasses making it a Class I bicycle facility. Cyclists must yield to pedestrians and runners (who are considered pedestrians by the law) at all times. As of 2006,  of the path were complete; when finished, in conjunction with the equestrian trail, the bikeway is expected to bridge three counties, touching on 17 cities and two national forests.

History

In 1977, the bike path was designated a National Recreation Trail.

In 2005, heavy rains caused extensive erosion on the path, requiring repairs from the state at about $1 million, part of an approximately $43 million clean-up in Southern California occasioned by the disaster.

Events
Since 1985, the trail is the avenue of the annual "Riverside to Surfside" bicycling event, formerly known as "Smog to Surf", in which cyclists ride the trail from Riverside, Corona or Anaheim to Huntington Beach.

Safety
In 1990, safety on the trail became a concern when it was occupied by homeless populations and street gangs. An increased police presence in 2009 led to a reduction in crime, though pockets of homeless camps have reappeared under some bridges along the trail.

From early 2016 into autumn 2017, the presence of tent camps along a 6.5-mile stretch centered near Angel Stadium resulted in many riders feeling uncomfortable. At the end of 2017, the trail was closed as authorities with the assistance of social service agencies removed those camping along the trail. As of April 2018, the trail was cleared of the remains of the encampments and reopened.

See also
 List of Orange County bike paths

References

External links

 Welcome to Santa Ana River Trail & Parkway
 Santa Ana River Trail (Orange County) - TrailLink

Santa Ana River
Bike paths in Los Angeles
Parks in Riverside County, California
Protected areas of San Bernardino County, California
Bike paths in Orange County, California
Transportation in Riverside County, California
Transportation in San Bernardino County, California
National Recreation Trails in California